United Nations Security Council Resolution 219, adopted unanimously on December 17, 1965, after reaffirming previous resolutions on the topic, the Council extended the stationing in Cyprus of the United Nations Peacekeeping Force in Cyprus for an additional 3 months, now ending on March 26, 1966.

The resolution was the last to be adopted by 11 member states. The following year, membership of the Security Council increased to 15 members.

See also
Cyprus dispute
List of United Nations Security Council Resolutions 201 to 300 (1965–1971)

References
Text of the Resolution at undocs.org

External links
 

 0219
 0219
December 1965 events